Leucosiidae is a family of crabs containing three subfamilies and a number of genera incertae sedis:

Cryptocneminae Stimpson, 1907 
 Cryptocnemus Stimpson, 1858 
 Leucisca MacLeay, 1838 
 Lissomorpha Ward, 1933 
 Onychomorpha Stimpson, 1858 
Ebaliinae Stimpson, 1871 
 Acanthilia Galil, 2000 
 Afrophila Galil, 2009 
 Alox C. G. S. Tan & Ng, 1995 
 Ancylodactyla Galil, 2004 
 Arcania Leach, 1817 
 Atlantolocia Galil, 2009 
 Atlantophila Galil, 2009 
 Atlantotlos Doflein, 1904 
 Bellidilia Kinahan, 1856 
 Callidactylus Stimpson, 1871 
 Cateios C. G. S. Tan & Ng, 1993
 Coralliocryptus Komai & Ng, 2012 
 Dolos C. G. S. Tan & Richer de Forges, 1993 
 Ebalia Leach, 1817 
 Ebaliopsis Ihle, 1918 
 Favus Lanchester, 1900 
 Galilia Ng & Richer de Forges, 2007 
 Heterolithadia Alcock, 1896 
 Heteronucia Alcock, 1896 
 Hiplyra Galil, 2009 
 Ihleus Ovaere, 1989 
 Ilia Leach, 1817 
 Iliacantha Stimpson, 1871 
 Ixa Leach, 1817 
 Kabutos Komatsu & Ng, 2011 
 Leucosilia Bell, 1855 
 Lithadia Bell, 1855 
 Lyphira Galil, 2009 
 Merocryptoides T. Sakai, 1963 
 Merocryptus A. Milne-Edwards, 1873 
 Myra Leach, 1817 
 Myrine Galil, 2001 
 Myropsis Stimpson, 1871 
 Nobiliela Komatsu & Takeda, 2003 
 Nucia Dana, 1852 
 Nuciops Serène & Soh, 1976 
 Nursia Leach, 1817 
 Nursilia Bell, 1855 
 Oreophorus Rüppell, 1830 
 Oreotlos Ihle, 1918 
 Orientotlos T. Sakai, 1980 
 Paranursia Serène & Soh, 1976 
 Parilia Wood-Mason & Alcock, 1891 
 Persephona Leach, 1817 
 Philyra Leach, 1817 
 Praebebalia Rathbun, 1911 
 Praosia C. G. S. Tan & Ng, 1993 
 Pseudomyra Capart, 1951 
 Pseudophilyra Miers, 1879 
 Pyrhila Galil, 2009 
 Randallia Stimpson, 1857 
 Raylilia Galil, 2001 
 Ryphila Galil, 2009 
 Speloeophoroides Melo & Torres, 1998 
 Speleophorus A. Milne-Edwards, 1865 
 Tanaoa Galil, 2003 
 Tlos Adams & White, 1849 
 Tokoyo Galil, 2003 
 Toru Galil, 2003 
 Uhlias Stimpson, 1871 
 Urashima Galil, 2003 
Leucosiinae Samouelle, 1819 
 Coleusia Galil, 2006 
 Euclosia Galil, 2003 
 Leucosia Weber, 1795 
 Seulocia Galil, 2005 
 Soceulia Galil, 2006 
 Urnalana Galil, 2005 
 incertae sedis
† Ampliura Morris & Collins, 1991 
† Andorina Lőrenthey, 1901 
† Duncanitrix Schweitzer, Dworschak & Martin, 2011 
† Gemmacarcinus Müller & Collins, 1991 
† Hepatinulus Ristori, 1886 
† Nucilobus Morris & Collins, 1991 
† Palaeomyra A. Milne-Edwards in Sismonda, 1861 
† Pterocarcinus Blow, 2003 
† Typilobus Stoliczka, 1871

References

External links 

Crabs
Decapod families
Taxa named by George Samouelle